Osmanlı Műdafaa-ı Hukûk-ı Nisvan Cemiyeti (Ottoman Society for the Defense of Women's Rights) was a women's organization in the Ottoman Empire, founded in 1913. It was the first Muslim women's organization as well as the main women's suffrage organization in Ottoman Empire and later day Turkey.

History
The issue of women's rights had been discussed during the Tanzimat era of modernization reforms in the 19th-century, when girl's schools had been founded and a women's press emerged. However, it was not until after the Revolution of 1908 that it became possible to establish a political organization to actively work for women's rights. The Osmanlı Műdafaa-ı Hukûk-ı Nisvan Cemiyeti was founded by Nuriye Ulviye Mevlan Civelek in 1913. It became the main force within the new Turkish women's movement.

The organization mainly worked through the women's magazine Women's World, which had been established the same year. The magazine voiced the demands of the organization. The Osmanlı Műdafaa-ı Hukûk-ı Nisvan Cemiyeti advocated women's liberation and participation in society alongside men by educating and enrolling women in the work force. It also spoke in favor of dress reform and advocated the removal of the veil, at least by replacing the full covering veil with a simple headscarf. The Kadınlar Dűnyası was the first Muslim magazine to publish photograps of women (highly controversial) and further more unveiled women dressed in modern costume, primarily the members and contributors of the Osmanlı Műdafaa-ı Hukûk-ı Nisvan Cemiyeti and the  Kadınlar Dűnyası.

References 

 Suad Joseph, Afsāna Naǧmābādī:  Encyclopedia of Women and Islamic Cultures: Family, Law and Politics
 https://etd.ohiolink.edu/apexprod/rws_etd/send_file/send?accession=miami1060799831&disposition=inline
 https://dergipark.org.tr/en/download/article-file/1476331

1913 establishments in the Ottoman Empire
Feminism and history
Feminist organizations in Turkey
Organizations established in 1913
Social history of Turkey